Mixed doubles curling at the 2020 Winter Youth Olympics was held from 18 to 22 January at the Palladium de Champéry in Champéry, Switzerland.

Teams
The teams will consist of athletes from the mixed team tournament, one boy and one girl from different NOCs. The teams will be selected by the organizing committee based on the final ranking from the mixed team competition in a way that balances out the teams. The players in each pair will then be allowed time to train together.

Knockout Draw Bracket
The event was held in a modified knockout, with all winners of the Round of 6, including the loser with the best Draw Shot Challenge (DSC), qualifying for the finals.

Top Half

Middle Half

Bottom Half

Ranking of Draw Shot Challenge

{|
|width=10% valign="top" |

Finals

Knockout results
All draw times are listed in Central European Time (UTC+01).

Round of 48

Draw 1
Saturday, January 18, 10:00

Draw 2
Saturday, January 18, 14:00

Draw 3
Saturday, January 18, 18:00

Draw 4
Saturday, January 19, 10:00

Draw 5
Sunday, January 19, 14:00

Draw 6
Sunday, January 19, 18:00

Round of 24

Draw 1
Monday, January 20, 10:00

Draw 2
Monday, January 20, 14:00

Draw 3
Monday, January 20, 18:00

Round of 12

Draw 1
Tuesday, January 21, 10:00

Draw 2
Tuesday, January 21, 13:30

Round of 6
Tuesday, January 21, 18:00

Semifinals
Wednesday, January 22, 9:30

Bronze Medal Game
Wednesday, January 22, 13:30

Gold Medal Game
Wednesday, January 22, 13:30

References

External links

YOG event page
World Curling Federation event page

Mixed doubles
Olympics